Faouzi Al-Kach (born 1933 in Lebanon) is a Lebanese painter, artist and writer.

Career
He grew up as the oldest of 6 siblings in a well-respected family of landowners going back several generations. In his early years he was surrounded by a simple farming community steeped in the traditional values of self-reliance and hard work. This humbling upbringing left an impression on Faouzi that would influence his art and writings for years to come.

He is driven by a strong love for literature, language and the intellectual curiosity and expression that can be derived from them, Faouzi pursued a career as a professor of Arabic language, literature and philosophy at the prestigious International School of Choueifat College Preparatory. This courier of more than three decades was accompanied by a personal pursuit in the areas of art and literature.

Over the years, Faouzi produced a steady flow of art exhibitions and books. In his art whether in oil, water color or ink, he always maintained a strong connection to people and earth. Faouzi extended the impressionistic style into his own form of artistic expression by using a bold and daring approach to color and movement.

As a writer, Faouzi covered a wide spectrum of subjects, including poetry, art critique, political commentary and socio-economic analysis.

Accomplishments
Faouzi Al-Kach
1968 - Published book "The Problems of Modern Art"
1968 - Recipient of Said Akl Prize for the book "The Problems of Modern Art"
1969 - Art exhibition at Carlton Hotel
1970 - Elected Vice President of the Lebanese Association of Artists
1971 - Wrote "Mice and Men of Society"
1971 - Art exhibition at Hotel Carlton "Paintings & Sketches"
1973 - Art exhibition in Zahle by civic sponsorship
1974 - Art exhibition "Men & Earth" at Goethe Institute
1974 - Subject of the book "Men & Earth" by art critique Abi Saleh
1978 - Art exhibition at Gab Center "Equality and Inequality"
1979 - Wrote The Arabic Alphabet for Spelling the Thought
1980 - Art exhibition at Gab Center
1980 - Art exhibition at Zahle sponsored by The Youth Center
1982 - Art exhibition at Gab Center
1991 - Art exhibition in Bath England
1994 - Published "Spelling the Thought"
2001 - Published "Money & Inflation"
2006 - Published "Wealth of the People and Beyond"
2009 - Published "Economic Crisis Solution & Global Industrial Revolution"
2011 - Published "Bekaa Valley Peasants", artwork documentary with 300 paintings

References

External links
 http://shared.selfip.com/faouzialkach/default.asp?itemID=207&itemTitle=Oil Paintings
 http://shared.selfip.com/faouzialkach/default.asp?itemID=208&itemTitle=Water Color
 http://shared.selfip.com/faouzialkach/default.asp?itemID=209&itemTitle=Chinese Ink

Lebanese writers
Living people
1933 births